Patricia Barber Polacco (born July 11, 1944) is an American author and illustrator. Throughout her school years, Polacco struggled with reading but found relief by expressing herself through art. Polacco endured teasing and hid her disability until a school teacher recognized that she could not read and began to help her. Her book Thank You, Mr. Falker is Polacco's retelling of this encounter and its outcome. She also wrote such books as Mr. Lincoln's Way and The Lemonade Club.

Early years
She is of Georgian, Russian and Ukrainian-Jewish descent on her mother's side and of Irish on her father's side.

She was born in 1944 in Lansing, Michigan, the daughter of a teacher and a salesman turned talk show host. Her parents divorced when she was three years old. She, her mother, and her brother went to live at her maternal grandmother's farm in Union City, Michigan, the setting of many of her stories. Polacco was discouraged in school and did not learn to read until she was nearly fourteen. In junior high school, one of her teachers finally discovered that dyslexia was the reason for her lack of confidence. Although her grandmother died in 1949, when Polacco was only five years old, she appears in several of Polacco's books.

At Oakland Technical High School, Polacco became friends with Frank Oz.

She wrote When Lightning Comes in a Jar as a tribute to her grandmother (referred to as "Babushka" in her books), and a cousin. She did not start writing and illustrating her first children's book until she was 41 years old. Polacco resides in Union City, Michigan, on a property she purchased which was originally known as "The Plantation".

Marriages

Polacco has married three times. She had two children, Traci and Steven, with her first husband. Her second marriage, to Graeme L Blackman, ended in a divorce. Her third husband, Enzo Mario Polacco (m. August 18, 1979), is a chef and cooking instructor.

Publications 
 Lillian Two Blossom (1988) 
 The Keeping Quilt (1988) 
 Rechenka's Eggs (1988) 
 Meteor! (1987) 
 Uncle Vova's Tree (1989) 
 Babushka's Doll (1990) 
 Just Plain Fancy (1990) 
 Thunder Cake (1990) 
 Appelemando's Dreams (1991) 
 Dream Keeper (1991) 
 Some Birthday! (1991) 
 Chicken Sunday (1992) 
 Mrs. Katz and Tush (1992) 
 Picnic at Mudsock Meadow (1992) 
 Babushka Baba Yaga (1993) 
 The Bee Tree (1993) 
 Firetalking (1994) 
 My Rotten Redheaded Older Brother (1994) 
 Pink and Say (1994) 
 Tikvah Means Hope (1994) 
 Babushka's Mother Goose (1995) 
 My Ol' Man (1995) 
 Aunt Chip And The Great Triple Creek Dam Affair (1996) 
 I Can Hear The Sun: A Modern Myth (1996) 
 The Trees of the Dancing Goats (1996) 
 Casey at the Bat: A Ballad of the Republic Sung in the Year 1888 (1997) ; Author: Ernest Lawrence Thayer, Illustrator: Patricia Polacco
 In Enzo's Splendid Gardens (1997) 
 Mrs. Mack (1998) 
 Thank You, Mr. Falker (1998) 
 Luba And The Wren (1999) 
 Welcome Comfort (1999) 
 The Butterfly (2000) 
 Betty Doll (2001) 
 Gracias, Sr. Falker (2001) , with Teresa Mlawer
 Mr. Lincoln's Way (2001) 
 Christmas Tapestry (2002) 
 When Lightning Comes In A Jar (2002) 
 G is for Goat (2003) 
 The Graves Family (2003) 
 John Philip Duck (2004) 
 Oh, Look! (2004) 
 An Orange for Frankie (2004) 
 Emma Kate (2005) 
 The Graves Family Goes Camping (2005) 
 Mommies Say Shhh (2005) 
 Rotten Richie and the Ultimate Dare (2006) 
 Ginger and Petunia (2006) 
 The Lemonade Club (2007) 
 For the Love of Autumn (2008) 
 Someone for Mr. Sussman (2008) 
 In Our Mothers' House (2009) 
 January's Sparrow (2009) 
 Junkyard Wonders (2010) 
 Something About Hensley's (2006) 
 Just in Time, Abraham Lincoln (2011) 
 Bun Bun Button (2011) 
 The Art of Miss Chew (2012) 
 Bully (2012) 
 Gifts of the Heart (2013) 
 The Blessing Cup (2013) 
 Clara and Davie (2014) 
 Mr. Wayne's Masterpiece (2014) 
 Tucky Jo and Little Heart (2015) 
 An A From Miss Keller (2015) 
 Fiona's Lace (2014) 
 The Mermaid's Purse (2016) 
 Because of Thursday (2016)

Other media
Aunt Chip and the Great Triple Creek Dam Affair. Video, Color, 23 minutes (New Rochelle, NY: Spoken Arts, 1996)
Babushka's Doll. Audio Cassette (New York: Scholastic, 1995)
The Butterfly. Audio Cassette (New Rochelle, NY: Spoken Arts, 1996)
The Butterfly. Video, Color, 30 minutes (New Rochelle, NY: Spoken Arts, 1996)
Chicken Sunday. Audio Cassette (New Rochelle, NY: Spoken Arts, 1992)
Chicken Sunday. Video, Color, 14 minutes (New Rochelle, NY: Spoken Arts, 1992)
The Keeping Quilt. Video, Color, 13 minutes (New Rochelle, NY: Spoken Arts, 1993)
Meteor! Audio Cassette (New Rochelle, NY: Spoken Arts, 1999)
Meteor! Video, Color, 13 minutes (New Rochelle, NY: Spoken Arts, 1999)
Mrs. Katz and Tush. Video, Color, 29 minutes (Lincoln, NB: Great Plains National, 1993)
Patricia Polacco: Dream Keeper. Video, Color, 23 Minutes (New York: Philomel, 1996)
Parents, Kids & Books: The Joys of Reading Together. Video, Color, 30 Minutes (Dallas, TX: Kera Productions, 1993)
Pink and Say. Audio Cassette (New Rochelle, NY: Spoken Arts, 1996)
Pink and Say. Video, Color, 28 minutes (New Rochelle, NY: Spoken Arts, 1996)
Rechenka's Eggs. Audio Cassette (New Rochelle, NY: Spoken Arts, 1991)
Rechenka's Eggs. Video, Color, 11 minutes (New Rochelle, NY: Spoken Arts, 1991)
Thank You, Mr. Falker. Audio Cassette (St. Petersburg, FL: Spoken Arts, 1999)
Thank You, Mr. Falker. Video, Color, 23 minutes (New Rochelle, NY: Spoken Arts, 1999)
Thunder Cake. Video, Color, 13 minutes (New Rochelle, NY: Spoken Arts, 1990)

Literary Awards
1988 Sydney Taylor Book Award for The Keeping Quilt
1989 International Reading Association Award for Rechenka's Eggs
March 10, 1990 Santa Clara Reading Council
Author's Hall of Fame
Commonwealth Club of California Recognition of Excellence for
1990 Babushka's Doll
1992 Chicken Sunday (Nov. 14th 1992 declared Chicken Sunday)

 1992 Society of Children's Book Writers and Illustrators

Golden Kite Award for Illustration for Chicken Sunday
1992 Boston Area Educators for Social Responsibility
Children's Literature and Social Responsibility Award
Nov. 9th 1993 Jane Adams Peace Assoc. and Women's Intl. League for Peace and Freedom Awards
Honor Award for Mrs. Katz and Tush for its effective contribution to peace and social justice.
Parent's Choice Honors
1991 Some Birthday
1997 Video/Dream Keeper
1998 Thank You, Mr. Falker

1996 North Dakota Library Association Children's Book Award for My Rotten Red Headed Older Brother
1996 Jo Osborne Award for Humor in Children's Literature
1997 Missouri Association of School Librarians
Show Me Readers Award for My Rotten Red Headed Older Brother
1997 West Virginia Children's Book Award for Pink and Say
1998 Mid-South Independent Booksellers for Children Humpty Dumpty Award
2014 Sydney Taylor Book Award for The Blessing Cup

Articles written about Polacco
Vandergrift, Kay E. "Peacocks, Dreams, Quilts, and Honey: Patricia Polacco, A Woman's Voice of Remembrance," In Ways of Knowing: Literature and the Intellectual Life of Children. Ed. By Kay E. Vandergrift. Lanham, MD: Scarecrow Press, 1996, pp. 259–288.
Vandergrift, Kay E. "Patricia Polacco," in Twentieth-Century Children's Writers. ed. by Laura Berger. 4th ed. Detroit: St. James, 1995. 759–760.
Profile, childrenslit.com; accessed on July 8, 2015.
Interview, TimeforKids.com; accessed on July 8, 2015.

References

External links

 

1944 births
American children's book illustrators
American children's writers
American women illustrators
American people of Russian-Jewish descent
American people of Ukrainian-Jewish descent
American people of Irish descent
Artists from Michigan
Jewish American writers
Jewish American artists
Artists from Oakland, California
Living people
Writers from Michigan
Writers from Oakland, California
American women children's writers
People from Union City, Michigan
Writers with dyslexia
Jewish women writers
21st-century American Jews
21st-century American women